Hee-sun, also spelled Hui-seon, is a Korean unisex given name. There are 24 hanja with the reading "hee" and 41 hanja with the reading "sun" on the South Korean government's official list of hanja which may be registered for use in given names.

People with this name include:
Kim Heesun (born 1972), South Korean female writer
Kim Hee-sun (born 1977), South Korean actress
HeeSun Lee (born 1983), South Korean-born American Christian singer
Jang Hee-sun (born 1986), South Korean female field hockey player
Joo Hee-sun, South Korean male music video director

Fictional characters with this name include:
Ahn Hee-sun, in 2013 South Korean television series All About My Romance
Moon Hee-sun, in 2013 South Korean television series That Winter, the Wind Blows

See also
List of Korean given names

References

Korean unisex given names